The 2011 Tro-Bro Léon was the 28th edition of the Tro-Bro Léon cycle race and was held on 17 April 2011. The race was won by Vincent Jérôme.

General classification

References

2011
2011 in road cycling
2011 in French sport